Davis Films  is a French independent film production company founded by Samuel Hadida in 1990. It is best known for producing the Resident Evil and Silent Hill film series adapted from video games.

It has been acting since the 1990s in partnership with other independent film companies in Hollywood, including Lionsgate, New Line Cinema and Screen Gems.

References

External links
  on Facebook

Film production companies of France
Metropolitan Filmexport films
Davis Films films